The 1924 Purdue Boilermakers football team was an American football team that represented Purdue University during the 1924 Big Ten Conference football season. In their third season under head coach James Phelan, the Boilermakers compiled a 5–2 record, finished in fifth place in the Big Ten Conference with a 2–2 record against conference opponents, and outscored opponents by a total of 137 to 46.

Schedule

References

Purdue
Purdue Boilermakers football seasons
Purdue Boilermakers football